Sean Fields (born March 6, 1981) is a Canadian former professional ice hockey goaltender.

Prior to turning professional, Fields attended Boston University. Playing four seasons with the Boston University Terriers men's ice hockey team (2000–04), Fields set, and still holds, the Hockey East record as the goaltender with the best career save percentage of 90.5%. Fields also holds the Boston Terriers record for most career wins with 62.

Awards and honors

References

External links

1981 births
Living people
Canadian ice hockey goaltenders
Boston University Terriers men's ice hockey players
Providence Bruins players
HDD Olimpija Ljubljana players
Tulsa Oilers (1992–present) players
Utah Grizzlies (AHL) players
Gwinnett Gladiators players
Canadian expatriate ice hockey players in Slovenia
Canadian expatriate ice hockey players in the United States